Echinothecium is a genus of fungi in the family Capnodiaceae.

References

Capnodiaceae
Dothideomycetes genera
Taxa named by Friedrich Wilhelm Zopf
Taxa described in 1898